Rosina Regina Ahles (5 December 1799, Bietigheim - 13 June 1854, Berlin) was a German actress, notable in her own right and as the wife of the actor, composer and writer Albert Lortzing.

Bibliography
Hans Hoffmann: Rosina Lortzing aus Bietigheim – Ein Leben an der Seite des Komponisten. In: Blätter zur Stadtgeschichte, Heft 6, Bietigheim-Bissingen 1987, S. 101–123

19th-century German actresses
German stage actresses
1799 births
1854 deaths